Brendan O'Sullivan may refer to:
 Brendan O'Sullivan (Kerry hurler), hurler with Kerry  and Ballyheigue
 Brendan O'Sullivan (Cork hurler) (born 1965), Irish hurler
 Brendan Jer O'Sullivan (born 1979), Irish Gaelic footballer